Corrupted are a Japanese doom/sludge metal band. They are known for avoiding interviews and publicity. They have recorded several albums, including split albums with other artists and perform regularly in Japan and abroad.

Musical style
They were described by JB Roe of Grooveshark as "some of the heaviest, gloomiest doom/sludge around, distinctly cacophonous, layering feedback pulverizing progressions into a distinctly cacophonous rumble." However, some songs feature long acoustic sections, spoken-word interludes, and unconventional instruments. An example of the latter can be found on their 2005 album El mundo frio, which is a 72-minute song with extensive sections of harp. Iann Robinson wrote on Nonelouder.com, "Right when you think you can peg Corrupted as an all Doom band they release a lush acoustic set within their bleak musical landscape."

They mainly sing in Spanish, with some songs containing sections in Japanese or English. 

In 2009, Terrorizer chose Corrupted's 1997 album Paso inferior as the seventeenth-best sludge album. They wrote at the time, 

In 2002, the band released a statement about interviews:

Discography

Albums
 Paso inferior (1997, Frigidity Discos)
 Llenandose de gusanos (1999, HG Fact)
 Se hace por los suenos asesinos (2004, HG Fact)
 El mundo frio (2005, HG Fact)
 Garten der Unbewusstheit (2011, Nostalgia Blackrain)

EPs
 Anciano (1995, Japan Overseas)
 El dios queja (1995, Tag Rag)
 Nadie (1995, Third Culture)
 Dios injusto (1999, Frigidity Discos)
 Felicific Algorithim (2018, Cold Spring Records)

Singles
 "La victima es tu mismo" (2001, View Beyond Records)
 "Vasana" (2007, HG Fact)
 "An Island Insane" (2007, HG Fact)
 "喪失: Loss" (2015, Crust War)

Splits
 with Grief (1995), HG Fact)
 with Black Army Jacket (1997, Frigidity Discos)
 with Enemy Soil (1997, HG Fact)
 with Noothgrush (1997, Reservoir)
 with Scarver's Calling (1999, Gouge Records)
 with Phobia (1999, Rhetoric Records / Deaf American Recordings)
 with Meat Slave (2000, HG Fact)
 with Machetazo (2000, Frigidity Records)
 with Sloth (2000, self-released)
 with Discordance Axis and 324 (2001, HG Fact)
 with Cripple Bastards (2002, HG Fact)
 with Infaust (2002, Blind Date)

Compilation appearances
 Raggle Taggle (1996, Tag Rag)
 Una de gato cuerno de vaca (1996, Tee Pee Records)
 Painkiller vol. 1 (1996, Devastating Soundworks)
 Reality No. 3 (1999, Deep Six Records)
 Homeless Benefit EP (1999, Bad Card Records)
 Twin Threat to Your Sanity (2001, Bad People Records)

Members
 Chew Hasegawa — drums
 Mark Yokota — guitar
 Ippei Suda — bass guitar
 Mother Sii — vocals

Previous members
 Yasushi Yoshida — vocals (live-only)
 Takaho — vocals (live-only)
 Kawabata — vocals (live-only)
 Rie lambdoll — vocals (live-only)
 Hevi — vocals, bass guitar
 Talbot — guitar
 Anri — harp on El mundo frio
 Takehito Miyagi — keyboards (studio-only)
 Shibata — bass guitar
 Jose — bass guitar
 Lowell Isles — bass guitar
 Katsumi Hiryu — bass guitar
 Monger — bass guitar

References

Japanese doom metal musical groups
Sludge metal musical groups
Musical groups established in 1994
Musical quartets
Political music groups
Musical groups from Osaka
1994 establishments in Japan